Heterospathe longipes is a species of palm tree. It is endemic to Fiji.

This species was moved to genus Heterospathe from the monotypic Alsmithia in 2005.

References

Areceae
Endangered plants
Trees of Fiji
Endemic flora of Fiji
Taxonomy articles created by Polbot